Jayesh Dilip Rane (born 20 February 1993) is an Indian professional footballer who plays as a midfielder for Bengaluru in the Indian Super League.

Career

Mumbai
Born in Mumbai, Maharashtra, Rane joined the Mumbai youth team in 2008. During the 2012 I-League U20, Rane ended as the league top scorer with thirteen goals. Rane was then called up to the first-team for the Federation Cup but did not see the field during the tournament due to Mumbai being knocked-out early. Rane did eventually make his debut for Mumbai in the I-League on 3 November 2012 against Salgaocar. He came on as a 90th-minute substitute for Subhas Chakrobarty as Mumbai lost 1–0. Rane then scored his first professional goal for the club the next season on 18 October 2013, also against Salgaocar. His 85th-minute strike was the only one though for Mumbai as the club lost 3–1.

Chennaiyin

Loan
In July 2014, it was announced that Rane would be among 84 Indian players who would be a part of the 2014 ISL Inaugural Domestic Draft, being available on loan from Mumbai. On 23 July 2014, he was drafted in the ninth round of the draft by Chennaiyin. He made his debut for Chennaiyin on 25 October 2014 against Delhi Dynamos. He came on as a halftime substitute for Balwant Singh as Chennaiyin lost 3–1.

Rane returned to Chennaiyin for the 2015 season. On 20 December 2015, Rane came on as a 68th-minute substitute for Jeje Lalpekhlua in the 2015 Indian Super League Final against Goa. In the end, Chennaiyin won the match 3–2, scoring two goals in stoppage time, to win the Indian Super League final.

2016 season
The 2016 season began well for Rane. He started the club's first match of the season against the 2014 champions, Atlético de Kolkata, and he scored his first goal for the club which tied the match at the time 1–1. In the end, Chennaiyin could only come away from the match with a 2–2 draw. His performance during the match lead to Rane being named the "Emerging Player of the Match".

ATK
Rane was bought by Atletico de Kolkata in the draft for the 2017 season in ISL. He played 13 games in the season without registering a goal or an assist. He signed a contract extension on 20 March 2018 with the club. On 2 December, in the match against Chennaiyin FC he scored his first goal for his club ATK.

Bengaluru FC
In July 2021, Rane moved to Bengaluru FC and debuted on 15 August in a 1–0 win over Maldivian side Club Eagles, in 2021 AFC Cup playoffs. In that match, he scored the winner.

International
In March 2015, Rane was called up to the India under-23 side which would take part in the 2016 AFC U-23 Championship qualifiers. Rane made his international debut with the side on 27 March 2016 against Uzbekistan U23. He started the match and played the full 90 minutes as India lost 2–0.

Career statistics

Club

Honours

Aizawl
I-League: 2016–17

Chennaiyin
Indian Super League: 2015

ATK
Indian Super League: 2019–20

Bengaluru
 Durand Cup: 2022

India U23
 South Asian Games Silver medal: 2016

Individual
FPAI Fans Player of the Year: 2015

References

External links 
 Indian Super League Profile.

1993 births
Living people
Footballers from Mumbai
Indian footballers
Mumbai FC players
Chennaiyin FC players
Aizawl FC players
ATK (football club) players
ATK Mohun Bagan FC players
Bengaluru FC players
Association football forwards
I-League players
Indian Super League players
India youth international footballers
South Asian Games silver medalists for India
South Asian Games medalists in football